La Guerche is a commune in the Indre-et-Loire department in central France.

Population
People from La Guerche are called Guerchois.

Popular culture
Louis Amédée Achard, an author created a character called Monsieur of La Guerche, who was the titular protagonist of Les chevauchées de M. de la Guerche.

See also
 Château de la Guerche
 House of Rougé
Communes of the Indre-et-Loire department

References

External links

Website of the Château de la Guerche

Communes of Indre-et-Loire